Dominica competed for the sixth time at the 2002 Commonwealth Games in Manchester. Six male athletes were sent to the games, but no females, competing in Athletics, Squash and Table Tennis  They did not win any medals.

See also
2002 Commonwealth Games results

References

2002
2002 in Dominica sport
Nations at the 2002 Commonwealth Games